This is a list of seasons completed by the Texas A&M Aggies college football program since the team's inception in 1894. The list documents season-by-season records, bowl game results, and conference records from 1915 to the present.

Seasons

Notes

References

Texas AandM

Texas AandM Aggies football seasons